Bevu Bella may refer to:

 Bevu Bella (1963 film), an Indian Kannada film
 Bevu Bella (1993 film), an Indian Kannada film